A subset of absolute idealism, British idealism was a philosophical movement that was influential in Britain from the mid-nineteenth century to the early twentieth century. The leading figures in the movement were T. H. Green (1836–1882), F. H. Bradley (1846–1924), and Bernard Bosanquet (1848–1923). They were succeeded by the second generation of J. H. Muirhead (1855–1940), J. M. E. McTaggart (1866–1925), H. H. Joachim (1868–1938), A. E. Taylor (1869–1945), and R. G. Collingwood (1889–1943). The last major figure in the tradition was G. R. G. Mure (1893–1979). Doctrines of early British idealism so provoked the young Cambridge philosophers G. E. Moore and Bertrand Russell that they began a new philosophical tradition, analytic philosophy.

Overview
British idealism was generally marked by several broad tendencies: a belief in an Absolute (a single all-encompassing reality that in some sense formed a coherent and all-inclusive system); the assignment of a high place to reason as both the faculty by which the Absolute's structure is grasped and as that structure itself; and a fundamental unwillingness to accept a dichotomy between thought and object, reality consisting of thought-and-object together in a strongly coherent unity.

British idealism largely developed from the German idealist movement—particularly such philosophers as Immanuel Kant and G. W. F. Hegel, who were characterised by Green, among others, as the salvation of British philosophy after the alleged demise of empiricism. Thomas Carlyle did much to bring awareness of German idealism to the English-speaking world, and his own contributions were also highly influential on British idealism. The movement was a reaction against the thinking of John Locke, David Hume, John Stuart Mill, Henry Sidgwick, and other empiricists and utilitarians.

Up until the early 1860s accurate translations of Hegel's works were not available in Britain. However, this situation changed in 1865 with the publication of James Hutchison Stirling's book The Secret of Hegel, which is believed to have won significant converts in Britain.

British idealism was influenced by Hegel at least in broad outline, and undeniably adopted some of Hegel's terminology and doctrines. Examples include not only the aforementioned Absolute, but also a doctrine of internal relations, a coherence theory of truth, and a concept of a concrete universal. Some commentators have also pointed to a sort of dialectical structure in e.g. some of the writings of Bradley. But few of the British idealists adopted Hegel's philosophy wholesale, and his most significant writings on logic seem to have found no purchase whatsoever in their thought. On the other hand, G. R. G. Mure was "a deep student of Hegel" 
who "was committed to Hegel's 'central ontological thesis' all his life."

On its political side, the British idealists were largely concerned to refute what they regarded as a brittle and "atomistic" form of individualism, as espoused by e.g. Herbert Spencer. In their view, humans are fundamentally social beings in a manner and to a degree not adequately recognized by Spencer and his followers. The British Idealists did not, however, reify the State in the manner that Hegel apparently did; Green in particular spoke of the individual as the sole locus of value and contended that the State's existence was justified only insofar as it contributed to the realization of value in the lives of individual persons.

The hold of British idealism in the United Kingdom weakened when Bertrand Russell and G. E. Moore, who were educated in the British idealist tradition, turned against it. Moore in particular delivered what quickly came to be accepted as conclusive arguments against Idealism. In the late 1950s G. R. G. Mure, in his Retreat From Truth (Oxford 1958), criticized Russell, Ludwig Wittgenstein, and aspects of analytic philosophy from an idealist point of view.

British idealism's influence in the United States was somewhat limited. The early thought of Josiah Royce had something of a neo-Hegelian cast, as did that of a handful of his less famous contemporaries. The American rationalist Brand Blanshard was  strongly influenced by Bradley, Bosanquet, and Green (and other British philosophers). Even this limited influence, though, petered out through the latter half of the twentieth century. However, from the 1990s on, there has been a significant revival in interest in these ideas, as evidenced by, for instance, by the founding of the Michael Oakeshott Association, and renewed attention to the work of Collingwood, Green, and Bosanquet.

British idealists 

 F. H. Bradley
 J. M. E. McTaggart
 Bernard Bosanquet
 T. H. Green
 Edward Caird
 John Caird
 Henry Jones
 John Stuart Mackenzie
 J. H. Muirhead
 William Ritchie Sorley
 H. H. Joachim
 R. B. Haldane, 1st Viscount Haldane
 G. F. Stout
 James Ward
 A. E. Taylor
 Andrew Seth Pringle-Pattison
 Norman Kemp Smith
 Sir James Black Baillie
 May Sinclair
 R. L. Nettleship
 W. R. Boyce Gibson
 John Alexander Smith
 H. J. Paton
 James Hutchison Stirling
 Alexander Campbell Fraser
 William Wallace
 Robert Adamson
 R. G. Collingwood
 H. Wildon Carr
 Michael Oakeshott
 William Temple
 C. A. Campbell
 David George Ritchie
 James Lindsay
 A. C. Ewing
 Hastings Rashdall

See also
Timothy Sprigge
List of British philosophers
British philosophy
Canadian idealism

Notes

References and further reading
 Tyler, Colin. "'All history is the history of thought': competing British idealist historiographies." British Journal for the History of Philosophy 28.3 (2020): 573-593; focus on  T.H. Green, Edward Caird, and F.H. Bradley.
Sorley, William Ritchie. 1920. A History of English Philosophy.
An idiosyncratic account of English-language philosophy with an emphasis on idealism, later republished as A History of British Philosophy to 1900. online
'British Absolute Idealism: From Green to Bradley', in Jeremy Dunham, Iain Hamilton Grant and Sean Watson (eds), Idealism (Acumen, 2011).

Idealism
British philosophy
Modern history of the United Kingdom